Kfar Truman (lit. Truman Village) is a moshav in central Israel. Located in the Shephelah around three kilometres east of Ben Gurion International Airport, it falls under the jurisdiction of Hevel Modi'in Regional Council.

History
According to Marom, during the 18th and 19th centuries, the area around Kfar Truman belonged to the Nahiyeh (sub-district) of Lod that encompassed the area of the present-day city of Modi'in-Maccabim-Re'ut in the south to the present-day city of El'ad in the north, and from the foothills in the east, through the Lod Valley to the outskirts of Jaffa in the west. This area was home to thousands of inhabitants in about 20 villages, who had at their disposal tens of thousands of hectares of prime agricultural land.

The moshav was established in 1949 by demobilised Palmach soldiers of the Harel Brigade, and was initially called Bnei Harel (Sons of Harel). In 1950, representatives of the Jewish Agency proposed changing the name to Kfar Truman, in honor of U.S. president Harry S. Truman, who had supported the establishment of the State of Israel. In return, the moshav was promised official recognition, thereby entitling it to services such as roads, running water and electricity. The forest alongside Kfar Truman was renamed for Margaret Truman, daughter of the president.

Kfar Truman was built on land which had belonged to the depopulated Palestinian village of Bayt Nabala.

References

Moshavim
Populated places established in 1949
Populated places in Central District (Israel)
1949 establishments in Israel